The following lists events that happened during 1975 in Cape Verde.

Incumbents
Portuguese Cape Verde:
Provincial high commissioner: Vicente Almeida d'Eça (until July 5)
Republic of Cape Verde (July 5 and after):
President: Aristides Pereira
Prime Minister: Pedro Pires

Events
 April 21: Paulino do Livramento Évora became the first Cape Verdean born bishop of Santiago de Cabo Verde
 June 30: the first Cape Verdean parliamentary elections took place 
 July 5 - Cape Verde gained independence after over 500 years of Portuguese rule. The National Assembly elected Aristides Pereira as President and Pedro Pires as Prime Minister.

Arts and entertainment
 Mindelo-based newspaper Terra Nova established
 March 12: The first transmission of television in the nation began under the name Televisão Experimental de Cabo Verde or TEVEC (now RTC)

Births
January 20: Boss AC, rapper
February 3: Lito, footballer and manager
November 5: Crispina Correia, basketball player
November 10: Suzanna Lubrano, singer
December 7: Mateus Lopes, footballer

Deaths
May 29: Sergio Frusoni (b. 1901), writer

References

 
Years of the 20th century in Cape Verde
1970s in Cape Verde
Cape Verde
Cape Verde